Bishwanath Ghosh is a Bangladeshi professional footballer who plays as a defender. He currently plays for Bashundhara Kings and Bangladesh national team.

International career 
On 4 September 2018, Bishwanath made his senior career debut against Bhutan during 2018 SAFF Championship.

International goals

Youth

Personal life
Bishwanath married his childhood girlfriend Chaity Ghosh in January 2020 in middle of 2020 Bangabandhu Cup. He took a three-hour break from his head coach during practise session for the same.

From religious views, Bishwanath is a follower of Hinduism.

References 

1999 births
Living people
Bangladeshi footballers
Bangladesh international footballers
Association football defenders
Footballers at the 2018 Asian Games
Asian Games competitors for Bangladesh
Bangladeshi Hindus
People from Tangail District
Bashundhara Kings players